David Frederick Cunningham (December 3, 1900 – February 22, 1979) was an American prelate of the Roman Catholic Church. He served as Bishop of Syracuse from 1970 to 1976.

Biography
David Cunningham was born in Walkerville, Montana, to David and Mary Ann (Fitzgerald) Cunningham. He was raised in Oswego, New York. He attended St. Michael's College in Toronto, Ontario, Canada, before returning to New York and studying at St. Bernard's Seminary in Rochester. He was ordained to the priesthood on June 12, 1926. He then served as a curate at St. Ambrose Church in Endicott, and was afterwards sent to further his studies at the Catholic University of America in Washington, D.C., from where he earned a Licentiate of Canon Law in 1930. Between 1930 and 1950, he served as secretary to Bishops Daniel Joseph Curley, John A. Duffy, and Walter Andrew Foery. He was raised to the rank of Domestic Prelate in 1941. He also served as an assistant at Loretto Rest Nursing Home and at St. John Church in Camden. In 1946 he was named pastor of St. John the Baptist Church and vicar general of the Diocese of Syracuse.

On April 5, 1950, Cunningham was appointed Auxiliary Bishop of Syracuse and Titular Bishop of Lampsacus by Pope Pius XII. He received his episcopal consecration on the following June 8 from Cardinal Francis Spellman, with Bishop Walter Foery and Archbishop Bryan Joseph McEntegart serving as co-consecrators. He was the first priest from the Syracuse Diocese to become a bishop. He attended all four sessions of the Second Vatican Council between 1962 and 1965. He was named Coadjutor Bishop of Syracuse by Pope Paul VI on June 16, 1967. He was appointed diocesan chancellor on September 1, 1969. Following the resignation of Bishop Foery, Cunningham succeeded him as the sixth Bishop of Syracuse on August 4, 1970.

After reaching the mandatory retirement age of 75, he resigned as bishop on November 9, 1976. He later died at his residence in Syracuse, aged 78. He is buried at St. Mary's Cemetery in DeWitt.

References

1900 births
1979 deaths
People from Silver Bow County, Montana
People from Oswego, New York
Roman Catholic bishops of Syracuse
American Roman Catholic clergy of Irish descent
Participants in the Second Vatican Council
Catholic University of America alumni
Catholics from Montana
20th-century American clergy